"Something for the weekend, sir?" was originally a euphemistic question asked by British barbers when offering condoms to their customers. It may now refer to:

Television
 Something for the Weekend (game show), a British game show
 Something for the Weekend (TV programme), a British programme mixing cooking, interviews, and general-interest clips
 Something for the Weekend, a sketch comedy show featuring Susie Blake, first broadcast in 1989
 "Something for the Weekend", an episode of The Grimleys

Music

Something for the Weekend (album), an album by The Chosen (1996 Detour records) Scottish Power pop "MOD" band (Donald Muir)
 Something for the Weekend (album), an album by Stackridge
 "Something for the Weekend" (song), a song by The Divine Comedy from Casanova
 "Something 4 the Weekend", a song by the Super Furry Animals
 Something for the Weekend, an album by Brass Construction
 Something for the Weekend, an album by Radio Stars
 "Something for the Weekend", a song by The Distractions
 "Something for the Weekend", a song by Fred & Roxy
 "Something for the Weekend", a song by Dave Audé featuring Luciana
 "Something for the Weekend", a song by Ben Westbeech

Other uses
 Something for the Weekend, a cookbook by Jamie Oliver
 Something for the Weekend, a novel by Pauline McLynn
 "Something for the Weekend", a newspaper column in The Times by John Diamond
 "Something for the Weekend", a weekly column by IT journalist Alistair Dabbs that ran between 2012 and 2022 in The Register